Harpalyke , also known as , is a retrograde irregular satellite  of Jupiter. It was discovered by a team of astronomers from the University of Hawaii led by Scott S. Sheppard in 2000, and given the temporary designation . In August 2003, the moon was named after Harpalyke, the incestuous daughter of Clymenus, who in some accounts was also a lover of Zeus (Jupiter).

Harpalyke belongs to the Ananke group, believed to be the remnants of a break-up of a captured heliocentric asteroid. It is about 4 kilometres in diameter and appears grey (color index R-V=0.43), similar to C-type asteroids. The satellite orbits Jupiter at an average distance of 21,064,000 km in 634.19 days, at an inclination of 147° to the ecliptic (147° to Jupiter's equator) with an eccentricity of 0.2441.

References 

 Ephemeris IAU-MPC NSES
 Mean orbital parameters NASA JPL

External links 
 David Jewitt pages
 Scott Sheppard pages

Ananke group
Moons of Jupiter
Irregular satellites
Discoveries by Scott S. Sheppard
Discoveries by David C. Jewitt
Discoveries by Yanga R. Fernandez
Discoveries by Eugene A. Magnier
20001123
Moons with a retrograde orbit